Jianghua ( "Jianghua Yao Autonomous County", ;  usually referred to as "Jianghua County") is an autonomous county of Yao people in the Province of Hunan, China, it is under the administration of Yongzhou Prefecture-level City.

Located on the southernmost margin of the province, it lies to the west of the border with Guangxi, and the north of the border with Guangdong. The county is bordered to the north by Dao and Ningyuan Counties,  to the northeast by Lanshan County, to the east by Lianzhou City, Liannan and Lianshan Counties of Guangdong, to the south by Babu and Pinggui Districts of Hezhou City and Zhongshan County of Guangxi, to the west by Fuchuan County of Guangxi and Jiangyong County. The county has 9 towns and 7 townships under its jurisdiction, the county seat is Tuojiang.

Administrative divisions
9 towns
 Baimangying
 Centianhe
 Dalupu
 Dayu 
 Helukou
 Mashi
 Shuikou 
 Taoyu
 Tuojiang

6 townships
 Dashiqiao
 Daxi 
 Jiepai
 Qiaoshi
 Weizhukou
 Xiangjiang

1 ethnic township
 Zhuang Xiaoyu

Climate

References
www.xzqh.org

External links 

 
County-level divisions of Hunan
Yongzhou
Yao autonomous counties